Gutau is a municipality in the district of Freistadt in the Austrian state of Upper Austria.

History
Its name was first recorded in 1122. During the Napoleonic Wars, the town was occupied several times. After 1945, it belonged to the soviet control zone. In 1955 the Soviets left, so the infrastructural repairs and constructions began.

Population

Language
In 2001, 98.1% of the population named German as their colloquial language, while 0.5% speaks Bosnian language, and a further 0.1% Turkish.

Sport
Gutau hosts stages for the Jänner Rallye, which was the season opener for the European Rally Championship in 2012.

Sights
The ruined, medieval Prandegg Castle is also located nearby.

You will also find a beautiful Church right in the centre of Gutau.

References

Cities and towns in Freistadt District